Mitko Petkov (born 12 June 1926) was a Bulgarian wrestler. He competed in two events at the 1956 Summer Olympics.

References

External links
 

1926 births
Possibly living people
Bulgarian male sport wrestlers
Olympic wrestlers of Bulgaria
Wrestlers at the 1956 Summer Olympics
Place of birth missing